The 2014 Novak Djokovic tennis season officially began on 30 December 2013 with the start of the 2014 ATP World Tour.

Yearly summary

Djokovic began the year with a warmup tournament win at the World Tennis Championship. At the Australian Open, he won against Lukáš Lacko in straight sets for the first round, won against Leonardo Mayer in straight sets, winning the first set with a bagel, and won against Denis Istomin in straight sets too. He continued his straight sets streak beating no.15 seed Fabio Fognini. Djokovic then met eventual champion Stanislas Wawrinka in the quarterfinals of the tournament, who defeated Djokovic in five sets, ending his 25 match winning streak at the Australian Open.

Djokovic chose to withdraw from the first round of the Davis Cup and returned in late February attempting to defend his Dubai title, however he reached the semi finals falling to eventual champion Roger Federer.

In March he returned to Indian Wells and Miami, winning both tournaments, in the first he avenged Federer in three sets and in the latter he defeated Rafael Nadal in straight sets, in their 40th match.

Djokovic played in the Monte-Carlo Masters, losing to Federer in the semifinals. This ended a remarkable unbeaten run in the Masters 1000 tournaments, starting with Shanghai in 2013, during which he won four consecutive Masters 1000 tournaments: (Shanghai, Paris, Indian Wells, and Miami). On 4 May, withdrew from ATP World Tour Masters 1000 Madrid having suffered a recurrence of the right arm injury that afflicted him at ATP World Tour Masters 1000 Monte-Carlo...

On 18 May, he defeated Nadal in Rome, it was his 19th ATP World Tour Masters 1000 trophy and he has now won five of the past seven titles at this tournament level; now tied at No. 13 with Muster in the Open Era titles leader list, with 44 crowns...

On 8 June, failed in his bid to win a first Roland Garros title, regain No. 1 in the Emirates ATP Rankings for the first time since 6 October 2014 and also complete a career Grand Slam (he would be the eighth man in tennis history)...Finished runner-up for a second time (also 2012), losing to Nadal in four sets...

Wins seventh Grand Slam championship and second Wimbledon crown (also 2011), beating No. 4 seed Federer in five sets in the final.
  
Lost prior to ATP World Tour Masters 1000 Toronto QFs for first time, when he saw his 11-match winning streak against Tsonga end...Saw his hopes of completing a Career Golden Masters end at the hands of Robredo in the ATP World Tour Masters 1000 Cincinnati 4R...

Dropped one set en route to reaching his eighth straight US Open SF (l. to Nishikori)...It was his 17th major SF in his past 18 Grand Slam championships...Beat seeds Kohlschreiber (4R) and Murray (QFs)...

On 5 October, improves to 24-0 in Beijing with fifth title (d. Berdych 60 62 in final)...Did not drop a set all week to win 46th career title...

On 11 October, saw his 28-match winning streak on Chinese soil come to an end in ATP World Tour Masters 1000 Shanghai SFs (l. to Federer)...

On 2 November, became the fifth active player (23rd in Open Era) to record 600 match wins as he captured his 20th ATP World Tour Masters 1000 title (d. Raonic) in Paris (his third trophy at the tournament, also 2009, 2013)...

On 16 November won the Barclays ATP World Tour Finals for the third straight year – and fourth time overall (also 2008)...He is the third player to win three straight year-end titles, after Ilie Nastase (1971–73) and Ivan Lendl (1985-87)...Went undefeated 4-0, but did not contest final due to Federer's back injury...Finished 2014 with a 61-8 match record, including seven titles and $14,250,527 in prize money

All matches
This table lists all the matches of Djokovic this year, including walkovers W/O (they are marked ND for non-decision)

Singles matches

Source

Doubles matches

Source

Exhibitions

Tournament schedule

Singles schedule

Doubles schedule

2013 source
2014 source

Yearly records

Head-to-Head matchups
Novak Djokovic has a  record against the top 10,  against the top 11–50, and  against other players.
Ordered by number of wins (Bolded number marks a top 10 player at the time of match, Italic means top 50)

 Andy Murray 
 Marin Čilić 
 Philipp Kohlschreiber 
 Milos Raonic 
 Denis Istomin 
 Jérémy Chardy 
 Gilles Simon 
 Radek Štěpánek 
 Rafael Nadal 
 Jo-Wilfried Tsonga 
 Roger Federer 
 David Ferrer 
 Tomáš Berdych 
 Grigor Dimitrov 
 Gaël Monfils 
 Kei Nishikori 
 Joao Sousa 
 John Isner 
 Fabio Fognini 
 Ernests Gulbis 
 Sam Querrey 
 Paul-Henri Mathieu 
 Guillermo García-López 
 Alejandro González 
 Julien Benneteau 
 Diego Schwartzman 
 Roberto Bautista-Agut 
 Andrei Golubev 
 Albert Montañés 
 Victor Hănescu 
 Pablo Carreno-Busta 
 Leonardo Mayer 
 Lukáš Lacko 
 Mikhail Kukushkin 
 Dominic Thiem 
 Tommy Robredo 
 Stanislas Wawrinka

Finals

Singles: 8 (7 titles, 1 runner-up)

Earnings

Bold font denotes tournament win

source：Novak Djokovic ATP Profile

See also
 2014 ATP World Tour
 2014 Roger Federer tennis season
 2014 Rafael Nadal tennis season
 2014 Andy Murray tennis season
 2014 Stanislas Wawrinka tennis season
 2014 Marin Čilić tennis season

References

External links
  
 ATP tour profile

Novak Djokovic tennis seasons
Djokovic
2014 in Serbian sport